My Octopus Teacher is a 2020 Netflix Original documentary film directed by Pippa Ehrlich and James Reed, which documents a year spent by filmmaker Craig Foster forging a relationship with a wild common octopus in a South African kelp forest. At the 93rd Academy Awards, it won the award for Best Documentary Feature.

Synopsis 
In 2018, Craig Foster began free-diving in a cold underwater kelp forest at a remote location in False Bay, near Cape Town, South Africa. The location was near Simon's Town on the Cape Peninsula, which is exposed to the cold Benguela current of the Atlantic Ocean.

He started to document his experiences and, in time, met a curious young octopus that captured his attention. The film shows Foster's growing intimate relationship with the octopus as he follows her around for nearly a year. They form a bond where she plays with Foster and allows him into her world to see how she sleeps, lives, and eats. She frequently has to defend herself against pyjama sharks. In one attack upon her, the octopus loses an arm, and retreats to her den to recover, slowly regenerating the arm over three months. In a later shark attack, she shows an incredibly improved creativity to survive, including sticking on the shark's back. After mating with a male octopus and producing numerous eggs, she dies naturally while tending to her eggs. Later, a shark scavenges her dead body and carries it off.

Foster describes the effect of this mentorship-like relationship the octopus provided him, teaching him a lesson on the fragility of life and humanity's connection with nature. This transfers to Foster creating a deeper bond with his son, Tom Foster, as his son develops as a diver and marine biology student.

Production 
In partnership with Sea Change Project, Off The Fence and ZDF Enterprises, My Octopus Teacher was executively produced by Ellen Windemuth. It was directed by Pippa Ehrlich and James Reed. Cinematography was directed by underwater cameraman Roger Horrocks with footage from Craig Foster and Roger Horrocks. A smaller amount of underwater footage, not shown in the film, but filmed by the same pairing at the same location, had been shown previously on Blue Planet II, episode 5.

Foster was also a producer via his involvement with the Sea Change Project, and his wife, Indian environmental journalist Swati Thiyagarajan, was production manager for the film.

The film, which Foster began filming in 2018, was ten years in the making and was the first South African nature documentary to be a Netflix Original.

Release and reception
My Octopus Teacher was released on 7 September 2020 on Netflix.

Critical response
My Octopus Teacher received critical acclaim. The site's critics consensus reads "A heartwarming look at the way a meaningful bond can transcend just about any barrier, this documentary will leave you asking your friends to come and see My Octopus Teacher with you." On Metacritic it has a weighted average score of 82% based on reviews from 5 critics.

Accolades

References

External links

 
 
 Official trailer
 Sea Change Project and its The Making of My Octopus Teacher 

2020 documentary films
2020 films
Best Documentary Feature Academy Award winners
Documentary films about marine biology
Films about friendship
Films about cephalopods
Netflix original documentary films
South African documentary films
2020s English-language films